Terence Hillary Albritton (January 14, 1955 – September 1, 2005) was an American track and field athlete, former shot put world record holder, and coach.

Career
Albritton was born in Newport Beach, California and attended Newport Harbor High School. He went on to the University of Hawaii and later graduated from Stanford University. He was a strength coach at the University of Hawaii from 1979 to 1985. He is regarded as a pioneer in importing the training techniques from the Soviet Union to the United States. These methods include power cleans, plyometrics, and other fast twitching muscle training techniques.

From 1990 to 2004, Albritton  was a teacher and assistant football coach at St. Anthony School in Wailuku, Hawaii and was also a personal trainer on Maui for professional athletes, including Shane Victorino of the Los Angeles Dodgers.

Albritton suffered a fatal heart attack in Phnom Penh, Cambodia, where he had retired in 2004.  At the time he had been writing a screenplay about travels in the Soviet Union. He was survived by sons, Shane and Thomas Albritton, and grandson, Thomas Vaethroeder.

Shot put accomplishments
World record: 71 ft, 8 inches (21.85m), 1976, Cooke Field, University of Hawaii
National shot put champion, 1976, 1977
National shot put runner-up, 1975

References
 Honolulu Advertiser
 Obituary

1955 births
2005 deaths
American male shot putters
Athletes (track and field) at the 1975 Pan American Games
Hawaii Rainbow Warriors track and field athletes
Pan American Games medalists in athletics (track and field)
Pan American Games bronze medalists for the United States
Stanford Cardinal men's track and field athletes
High school football coaches in Hawaii
Newport Harbor High School alumni
Track and field athletes from California
World record setters in athletics (track and field)
Medalists at the 1975 Pan American Games
20th-century American people